Juan José Ribera Fonseca (born 11 October 1980) is a Chilean football manager and former player who played as a midfielder. He is the current manager of Deportes Temuco.

Ribera played for Chile in the 1997 FIFA U-17 World Championship in Egypt.

Honours

Club

As player
Universidad Católica
 Primera División de Chile (1): 2002 Apertura

Unión Española
 Primera División de Chile: 2005 Apertura

References

External links
 
 

1980 births
Living people
Footballers from Santiago
Chilean footballers
Association football midfielders
Club Deportivo Universidad Católica footballers
Provincial Osorno footballers
Puerto Montt footballers
Universidad de Concepción footballers
Unión Española footballers
Everton de Viña del Mar footballers
Deportes Concepción (Chile) footballers
Ñublense footballers
Deportes La Serena footballers
Santiago Morning footballers
Chilean Primera División players
Chilean football managers
Deportes Concepción (Chile) managers
Coquimbo Unido managers
Rangers de Talca managers
Audax Italiano managers
Deportes Antofagasta managers
Deportes Temuco managers
Chilean Primera División managers
Primera B de Chile managers
People from Santiago
People from Santiago Province, Chile
People from Santiago Metropolitan Region